Maplewood Cemetery is a cemetery in Freehold Township, in Monmouth County, New Jersey. It was established in the late 1800s.

Notable interments
 Joseph D. Bedle (1821–1894), Governor of New Jersey from 1875–1878
 Stanley Dancer (1927–2005), Harness racing trainer and driver
 Charles Haight (1838–1891), United States Congressman who represented New Jersey's 2nd congressional district from 1867–1871
 Joel Parker (1816–1888), Governor of New Jersey from 1863–1866 and from 1871–1874
 Daniel Bailey Ryall (1789–1864), United States Representative from New Jersey, in office from 1839–1841
 William H. Vredenburgh (1840–1920), Judge of the New Jersey Court of Errors and Appeals

References

External links
 Official website
 
 Freehold Cemetery at The Political Graveyard
 

Cemeteries in Monmouth County, New Jersey
Freehold Township, New Jersey